Bugiardo is the fourth studio album by Italian rapper Fabri Fibra. It was released on 9 November 2007 by Universal Music Group.

Track listing

First edition 
 Bugiardo – 4:05
 La Soluzione – 3:57
 Tu Così Bella non ce L'hai – 4:21
 Andiamo a Sanremo – 5:13
 Un'altra Chance (feat. Alborosie) – 5:13
 Cento Modi per Morire (feat. Metal Carter) – 5:15
 In Italia – 3:39
 Cattiverie – 3:13
 Questo è il Nuovo Singolo – 3:26
 La Posta di Fibra – 5:00
 Le Ragazze (feat. Nesli) – 4:21
 Non c'è Tempo – 4:00
 Sempre Io – 3:41
 Il più Pazzo – 3:18
 Questa Vita – 3:28
 Potevi Essere Tu – 3:51
 Non Provo più Niente – 4:55

Second Edition 
 Bugiardo – 4:05
 La Soluzione – 3:57
 Tu Così Bella non Ce L'hai – 4:21
 Andiamo a Sanremo – 5:13
 Un'altra Chance (feat. Alborosie) – 5:13
 Cento Modi per Morire (feat. Metal Carter) – 5:15
 In Italia (feat. Gianna Nannini) – 3:29
 Cattiverie – 3:13
 Questo è il Nuovo Singolo – 3:26
 La Posta di Fibra – 5:00
 Le Ragazze (feat. Nesli) – 4:21
 Non c'è Tempo – 4:00
 Sempre Io – 3:41
 Il più Pazzo – 3:18
 Questa Vita – 3:28
 Potevi Essere Tu – 3:51
 Non Provo più Niente – 3:13
 Arrivano – 4:06
 Hip Hop – 3:38

Charts

Certifications

References

2007 albums
Fabri Fibra albums